= Bowling at the 2010 South American Games – Men's doubles =

The Men's doubles event at the 2010 South American Games was held on March 25 at 9:00.

== Medalists ==
Gold	Silver	Bronze
Manuel Otalora; Andrés Gómez; Colombia	Juliano Oliveira; Charles Robini; Brazil	Jaime González; David Romero; Colombia

== Results ==
Rank	Team	Athlete	Games						Total	Avg	Grand
Rank	Team	Athlete	G1	G2	G3	G4	G5	G6	Total	Avg	Grand
1st place, gold medalist(s)	Colombia 2	Andrés Gómez (COL)	196	203	181	156	213	218	1167	194.5	2296
1st place, gold medalist(s)	Colombia 2	Manuel Otalora (COL)	199	158	212	209	170	181	1129	188.2	2296
2nd place, silver medalist(s)	Brazil 2	Juliano Oliveira (BRA)	174	219	190	237	178	177	1175	195.8	2289
2nd place, silver medalist(s)	Brazil 2	Charles Robini (BRA)	166	204	164	172	223	185	1114	185.7	2289
3rd place, bronze medalist(s)	Colombia 1	Jaime González (COL)	155	172	211	212	191	198	1139	189.8	2286
3rd place, bronze medalist(s)	Colombia 1	David Romero (COL)	199	193	203	172	196	184	1147	191.2	2286
4	Venezuela 1	Danny Fung Sun (VEN)	205	170	183	165	184	193	1100	183.3	2275
4	Venezuela 1	Luis Richard Olivo (VEN)	195	192	177	218	184	209	1175	195.8	2275
5	Venezuela 2	Rafael Eduardo Medina (VEN)	160	150	188	197	171	175	1041	173.5	2235
5	Venezuela 2	Ildemaro Ricardo Ruiz (VEN)	168	188	186	205	246	201	1194	199.0	2235
6	Peru 1	Victor Ricardo Takechi (PER)	159	135	191	171	192	221	1069	178.2	2215
6	Peru 1	Adolfo Edgardo Chang (PER)	188	136	216	204	201	201	1146	191.0	2215
7	Brazil 1	Walter Costa (BRA)	183	150	175	145	157	224	1034	172.3	2199
7	Brazil 1	Marcio Vieira (BRA)	203	158	257	166	182	199	1165	194.2	2199
8	Ecuador 1	Jorge Luis Perez (ECU)	137	180	186	181	169	221	1074	179.0	2168
8	Ecuador 1	Diogenes Jose Borja (ECU)	222	143	209	146	170	204	1094	182.3	2168
9	Netherlands Antilles 2	Carlos Finx (AHO)	197	190	150	235	146	218	1136	189.3	2141
9	Netherlands Antilles 2	Felix Ibañez (AHO)	154	185	149	193	157	169	1005	167.5	2141
10	Aruba 2	Jason Odor (ARU)	135	192	205	176	192	219	1119	186.5	2082
10	Aruba 2	Laurence Wilming (ARU)	150	146	185	173	192	117	963	160.5	2082
11	Argentina 2	Ricardo Javier Rosa (ARG)	178	155	188	189	181	142	1033	172.2	2073
11	Argentina 2	Jonathan Ariel Hocsman (ARG)	183	187	156	154	167	193	1040	173.3	2073
12	Chile 1	Harold André Pickering (CHI)	199	149	158	138	186	174	1004	167.3	2052
12	Chile 1	Luis Felipe Gonzalez (CHI)	224	172	178	145	181	148	1048	174.7	2052
13	Aruba 1	Errol Brown (ARU)	168	178	181	167	152	176	1022	170.3	2033
13	Aruba 1	Nelson Kelly (ARU)	171	164	190	180	133	173	1011	168.5	2033
14	Peru 2	Denis Richard Toyoda (PER)	157	147	141	206	133	134	918	153.0	2033
14	Peru 2	Eduardo Fujinaka (PER)	156	198	182	185	213	181	1115	185.8	2033
15	Chile 2	Adrian Reyes Vargas (CHI)	143	174	193	178	178	169	1035	172.5	2026
15	Chile 2	Pablo Alejandro Pohl (CHI)	160	149	163	169	165	185	991	165.2	2026
16	Netherlands Antilles 1	Emiel Samander (AHO)	175	186	136	168	188	132	985	164.2	2005
16	Netherlands Antilles 1	Tarik Samander (AHO)	173	179	180	146	163	179	1020	170.0	2005
17	Bolivia 1	Pablo Hinojosa Rojas (BOL)	170	131	179	174	143	165	962	160.3	1997
17	Bolivia 1	Oscar Guillermo Candia (BOL)	186	189	161	154	212	133	1035	172.5	1997
18	Bolivia 2	Sebastian Nemtala Garcia (BOL)	159	171	165	161	194	176	1026	171.0	1935
18	Bolivia 2	Ignacio Rojas Patino (BOL)	143	179	108	168	158	153	909	151.5	1935
19	Paraguay 1	Jorge Luis Alarcon (PAR)	186	166	155	135	159	160	961	160.2	1835
19	Paraguay 1	Alejandro Ignacio Lopez (PAR)	156	159	158	146	130	125	874	145.7	1835
20	Paraguay 2	Alejandro Kelly Carricarte (PAR)	149	188	152	179	171	124	963	160.5	1790
20	Paraguay 2	Chieh Hsiao Tzu (PAR)	139	177	115	137	133	126	827	137.8	1790
21	Argentina 1	Sebastian Montalbetti (ARG)	0	179	170	168	183	177	877	146.2	1696
21	Argentina 1	Christian Fernando Dalmasso (ARG)	0	183	141	177	170	148	819	136.5	1696
